Alejandro Humberto Gaete Duarte (born 25 January 1986) is a Chilean footballer that currently plays for San Marcos de Arica in the Primera B.

Honours

Club
Universidad Católica
 Primera División de Chile (1): 2005 Clausura

Deportes Ovalle
 Copa Chile (1): Runner-up 2008–09

External links
 
 

1986 births
Living people
Chilean footballers
Chilean Primera División players
Primera B de Chile players
Coquimbo Unido footballers
Ñublense footballers
Deportes Ovalle footballers
Universidad de Concepción footballers
Everton de Viña del Mar footballers
Deportes Concepción (Chile) footballers
Association football defenders